Pulgarcito (Spanish for "Tom Thumb") was a weekly illustrated magazine of Spain that was published by Editorial Bruguera (originally named El Gato Negro, though it retained a black cat as its logo) from June 1921 to 1987.

An extremely popular periodical in its first years, Pulgarcito offered short stories, articles, pastimes, and jokes, with only a few comic strips. Economic difficulties caused by the Spanish Civil War led to only 13 issues being published between 1945 and 1947, though it recovered after 1952, with more prominence given to comic strips and a stable of new comic characters, including:

Zipi y Zape (characters that later got their own magazine)
Las hermanas Gilda
Carpanta
El profesor Tragacanto

Both Ibáñez and Jan worked on Pulgarcito during its last years.  With the demise of the Editorial Bruguera publishing house, Pulgarcito was discontinued.

References

Comics magazines published in Spain
Magazines established in 1921
1921 comics debuts
Magazines disestablished in 1986
1986 comics endings
Weekly magazines published in Spain
Defunct magazines published in Spain
Spanish-language magazines
Tom Thumb